Jenny Pyper is a Northern Ireland civil servant. On 27 November 2020 she was appointed as Interim Head of the Northern Ireland Civil Service, taking up the position for eight months from 1 December, and succeeding David Sterling, who stepped down from the role in August 2020. Pyper previously served as Chief Executive of the Utility Regulator.

Career
Pyper joined the civil service in 1985, and worked in a number of economic development roles. In 2004 she was appointed as Director of Energy Policy at the Department of Enterprise, Trade and Investment, before later taking up the role of Director of Regional Planning and Transportation at the Department for Regional Development. In 2011 she became Deputy Secretary at the Department for Social Development, and joined the Utility Regulator in 2013. She retired from the Utility Regulator in the autumn of 2020. Her appointment as interim head of the Northern Ireland Civil Service was announced after Arlene Foster and Michelle O'Neill, Northern Ireland's First and Deputy First Ministers respectively, were unable to agree on a permanent candidate for the post. She became the first woman to occupy the role.

References

Year of birth missing (living people)
Living people
Civil servants from Northern Ireland
Heads of the Northern Ireland Civil Service